Ahmad Ali Moghimi ( Persian: احمد علی مقیمی ) born 1957 in Behshahr is an Iranian politician, a member of the eighth and ninth parliaments of the Islamic Consultative Assembly of Iran from Behshahr and Neka and Galougah constituencies, and a lawyer with a doctorate in international law.

Controversies 
Moghimi was embroiled in a sex-tape scandal in 2019. He, on the other hand, dismissed the video as "fake."

References 

Iranian politicians
1957 births
Living people